An earthquake warning system or earthquake early warning system is a system of accelerometers, seismometers, communication, computers, and alarms that is devised for notifying adjoining regions of a substantial earthquake while it is in progress. This is not the same as earthquake prediction, which is currently incapable of producing decisive event warnings.

Time lag and wave projection
An earthquake is caused by the release of stored elastic strain energy during rapid sliding along a fault. The sliding starts at some location and progresses away from the hypocenter in each direction along the fault surface. The speed of the progression of this fault tear is slower than, and distinct from the speed of the resultant pressure and shear waves, with the pressure wave traveling faster than the shear wave. The pressure waves generate an abrupt shock. The shear waves generate periodic motion (at about 1 Hz) that is the most destructive to structures, particularly buildings that have a similar resonant period. Typically, these buildings are around eight floors in height. These waves will be strongest at the ends of the slippage, and may project destructive waves well beyond the fault failure. The intensity of such remote effects are highly dependent upon local soils conditions within the region and these effects are considered in constructing a model of the region that determines appropriate responses to specific events.

Transit safety
Such systems are currently implemented to determine appropriate real-time response to an event by the train operator in urban rail systems such as BART (Bay Area Rapid Transit) and LA Metro. The appropriate response is dependent on the warning time, the local right-of-way conditions and the current speed of the train.

Deployment

As of 2016, Japan and Taiwan have comprehensive, nationwide earthquake early warning systems. Other countries and regions have limited deployment of earthquake warning systems, including Mexico (the Mexican Seismic Alert System covers areas of central and southern Mexico including Mexico City and Oaxaca), limited regions of Romania (the Basarab bridge in Bucharest), and parts of the United States. The earliest automated earthquake pre-detection systems were installed in the 1990s; for instance, in California, the Calistoga fire station's system which automatically triggers a citywide siren to alert the entire area's residents of an earthquake. Some California fire departments use their warning systems to automatically open overhead doors of fire stations before the earthquake can disable them. While many of these efforts are governmental, several private companies also manufacture earthquake early warning systems to protect infrastructure such as elevators, gas lines and fire stations.

Canada
In 2009, an early warning system called ShakeAlarm was installed and commissioned in Vancouver, British Columbia, Canada. It was placed to protect a piece of critical transportation infrastructure called the George Massey Tunnel, which connects the north and south banks of the Fraser River. In this application the system automatically closes the gates at the tunnel entrances if there is a dangerous seismic event inbound. The success and the reliability of the system was such that as of 2015 there have been several additional installations on the west coast of Canada and the United States, and there are more being planned.

Japan
Japan's Earthquake Early Warning system was put to practical use in 2006. The system that warns the general public was installed on October 1, 2007. It was modeled partly on the Urgent Earthquake Detection and Alarm System (UrEDAS) of Japan Railways, which was designed to enable automatic braking of bullet trains.

Gravimetric data from the 2011 Tōhoku earthquake has been used to create a model for increased warning time compared to seismic models, as gravity fields travel at the speed of light, much faster than seismic waves.

Mexico
The Mexican Seismic Alert System, otherwise known as SASMEX, began operations in 1991 and began publicly issuing alerts in 1993. It is funded by the Mexico City government, with financial contributions from several states that receive the alert. Initially serving Mexico City with twelve sensors, the system now has 97 sensors and is designed to protect life and property in several central and southern Mexican states.

United States

The United States Geological Survey (USGS) began research and development of an early warning system for the West Coast of the United States in August 2006, and the system became demonstrable in August 2009. Following various developmental phases, version 2.0 went live during the fall of 2018, allowing the "sufficiently functional and tested" system to begin Phase 1 of alerting California, Oregon and Washington.

Even though ShakeAlert could alert the public beginning September 28, 2018, the messages themselves could not be distributed until the various private and public distribution partners had completed mobile apps and made changes to various emergency alerting systems. The first publicly available alerting system was the ShakeAlertLA app, released on New Year's Eve 2018 (although it only alerted for shaking in the Los Angeles area). On October 17, 2019, Cal OES announced a statewide rollout of the alert distribution system in California, using mobile apps and the Wireless Emergency Alerts (WEA) system. California refers to their system as the California Earthquake Early Warning System. A statewide alert distribution system was rolled out in Oregon on March 11, 2021 and in Washington on May 4, 2021, completing the alert system for the West Coast.

Global systems

Earthquake Network

In January 2013, Francesco Finazzi of the University of Bergamo started the Earthquake Network research project which aims at developing and maintaining a crowdsourced earthquake warning system based on smartphone networks. Smartphones are used to detect the ground shaking induced by an earthquake and a warning is issued as soon as an earthquake is detected. People living at a further distance from the epicenter and the detection point may be alerted before they are reached by the damaging waves of the earthquake. People can take part in the project by installing the Android application "Earthquake Network" on their smart phones. The app requires the phone to receive the alerts.

MyShake
In February 2016, the Berkeley Seismological Laboratory at University of California, Berkeley (UC Berkeley) released the MyShake mobile app. The app uses accelerometers in phones that are stationary and connected to a power supply to record shaking and relay that information back to the laboratory. The system issues automated warnings of earthquakes of magnitude 4.5 or greater. UC Berkeley released a Japanese-language version of the app in May 2016. By December 2016, the app had captured nearly 400 earthquakes worldwide.

Android Earthquake Alerts System
On August 11, 2020, Google announced that its Android operating system would begin using accelerometers in devices to detect earthquakes (and send the data to the company's "earthquake detection server"). As millions of phones operate on Android, this may result in the world's largest earthquake detection network.

Initially, the system only collected earthquake data and did not issue alerts (except for on the West Coast of the United States, where it provided alerts issued by the USGS's ShakeAlert system and not from Google's own detection system). Data collected by Android devices was only used to provide fast information on the earthquake via Google Search, although it was always planned to issue alerts for many other areas based on Google's detection capabilities in the future. On April 28, 2021, Google announced the rollout of the alert system to Greece and New Zealand, the first countries to receive alerts based on Google's own detection capabilities. Google's alerts were extended to Turkey, the Philippines, Kazakhstan, Kyrgyz Republic, Tajikistan, Turkmenistan and Uzbekistan in June 2021.

OpenEEW
On August 11, 2020, Linux Foundation, IBM and Grillo announced the first fully open-source earthquake early-warning system, featuring instructions for a low-cost seismometer, cloud-hosted detection system, dashboard and mobile app. This project is supported by USAID, the Clinton Foundation and Arrow Electronics. Smartphone-based earthquake early-warning systems are dependent on a dense network of users near the earthquake rupture zone, whereas OpenEEW has focused instead on providing affordable devices that can be deployed in remote regions close to where earthquakes can begin. All components of this system are open source and available on the project's GitHub repositories.

Social media
Social networking sites such as Twitter and Facebook play a significant role during natural disasters. The United States Geological Survey (USGS) has investigated collaboration with the social networking site Twitter to allow for more rapid construction of ShakeMaps.

See also
Earthquake engineering
Earthquake preparedness
P-wave
Seismic retrofit
Earthquake Early Warning (Japan)
Mexican Seismic Alert System

References

External links

Earthquake Early Warning – California Institute of Technology
Bayesian Networks for Earthquake Magnitude Classification in a Early Warning System
Earthquake Network - The Earthquake Network project website
Earthquake Early Warning for Developing Countries - Grillo website
An Open Source Earthquake Early Warning System - OpenEEW website

Earthquake and seismic risk mitigation